Alexander Mikhailovich Dodonov (February 24, [OS 12] 1837 — February 1 [OS January 19], 1914) was a Russian opera singer. Vocally, he is best described as a lyric or spinto (lyric dramatic) tenor.

He was born in St Petersburg, and was a pupil of Felice Ronconi, Manuel Patricio Rodríguez García (son) and Francesco Lamperti. He sang for two years at the Italian operatic scenes in (Milan and Naples), then in Odessa and Kiev. He was a soloist at the Moscow Bolshoi Theatre from 1869 to 1891.

He sang the role of the Schoolmaster (Школьный учитель) at the premiere of Peter Tchaikovsky's opera Cherevichki in Moscow, at the Bolshoi Theatre on January 31 [OS January 19] 1887, which was conducted by Pyotr Tchaikovsky.

Teaching and writing
He became a professor of the Moscow College of Music and Drama. Among his pupils were Leonid Sobinov and Dmitri Smirnov. He published his "Руководство к правильной постановке голоса и изучению искусства пения" (“The Guidance to the correct setting of voice and learning of skill of singing”) in 1891. He died in Moscow.

References 

1837 births
1914 deaths
19th-century male opera singers from the Russian Empire
20th-century Russian male opera singers
Russian operatic tenors
Voice teachers
Singers from Saint Petersburg
Pupils of Manuel García (baritone)